Agnorisma is a genus of moths of the family Noctuidae. Agnorisma species were formerly included in the genus Xestia.

Species
Agnorisma badinodis (formerly Xestia badinodis) – Pale-banded Dart Moth
Agnorisma bollii (formerly Xestia bollii)
Agnorisma bugrai (formerly Xestia collaris) – Collared Dart Moth

References
Natural History Museum Lepidoptera genus database
Description

Noctuinae
Noctuoidea genera